Nebria angusticollis angusticollis is a subspecies of ground beetle in the Nebriinae subfamily that can be found in the Alps of France, Italy, and Switzerland.

References

angusticollis angusticollis
Beetles described in 1810
Beetles of Europe